Beringomyia is an Asian genus of crane fly in the family Limoniidae.

Species
B. cata (Alexander, 1940)
B. deprava (Alexander, 1941)
B. politonigra Savchenko, 1980
B. prava (Alexander, 1940)

References

Limoniidae
Diptera of Asia
Nematocera genera